Antheraea jana is a moth of the family Saturniidae first described by Stoll in 1782. It is found in Sundaland, the Andamans and Myanmar.

References

Antheraea
Moths of Asia
Moths described in 1782